The 2012–13 Belgian Hockey League season was the 93rd season of the Belgian Hockey League, the top level of ice hockey in Belgium. 10 teams participated in the league, and the Chiefs Leuven won the championship.

Regular season

Playoffs

External links
 Royal Belgian Ice Hockey Federation

Bel
Belgian Hockey League seasons
Bel